Nesovitrea binneyana, common name the blue glass snail, is a species of air-breathing land snail, a terrestrial pulmonate gastropod mollusk in the family Oxychilidae, the glass snails.

This species is named in honor of the American malacologist William G. Binney. It lives in environments under rocks and logs, with leaf litter present and can be found both inland and in coastal areas.

Distribution 
This species occurs in North America.

References

Oxychilidae
Gastropods described in 1864